The UEFA Futsal Euro 2022 qualifying competition will be a men's futsal competition that determines the 15 teams joining the automatically qualified hosts Netherlands in the UEFA Futsal Euro 2022 final tournament, the first tournament to be held on a four-year basis and featuring 16 teams.

A record number of 50 of the 55 UEFA member national teams entered the competition, including Austria and Northern Ireland which entered for the first time. Apart from hosts Netherlands, the remaining 49 teams entered the qualifying competition. The 16 teams which advanced to the 2020 FIFA Futsal World Cup European qualifying elite round were given byes to the qualifying group stage, which for the first time would be played in home-and-away round-robin format, while the remaining 33 teams entered in the qualifying round.

Format
The qualifying competition consists of four rounds:
Qualifying round: The 33 teams which enter this round are drawn into nine groups: six groups of four teams and three groups of three teams. Each group is played in single round-robin format at one of the teams selected as hosts before the draw. The nine group winners advance to the qualifying group stage, while the nine group runners-up and the five third-placed teams with the best record against the first and second-placed teams in their group advance to the qualifying round play-offs.
Qualifying round play-offs: The 14 teams are drawn into seven ties to play home-and-away two-legged matches. The seven winners advance to the qualifying group stage.
Qualifying group stage: The 32 teams (16 World Cup qualifying elite round teams which receive bye to this round, nine qualifying round group winners and seven qualifying round play-off winners) are drawn into eight groups of four. Each group is played in home-and-away round-robin format. The eight group winners and the six runners-up with the best record against all teams in their group qualify for the final tournament, while the remaining two runners-up advance to the play-offs.
Play-offs: The two teams play home-and-away two-legged matches to determine the last qualified team.

Tiebreakers
In the qualifying round and qualifying group stage, teams are ranked according to points (3 points for a win, 1 point for a draw, 0 points for a loss), and if tied on points, the following tiebreaking criteria are applied, in the order given, to determine the rankings (Regulations Articles 14.01, 14.02 and 17.01):
Points in head-to-head matches among tied teams;
Goal difference in head-to-head matches among tied teams;
Goals scored in head-to-head matches among tied teams;
(Qualifying group stage only) Away goals scored in head-to-head matches among tied teams;
If more than two teams are tied, and after applying all head-to-head criteria above, a subset of teams are still tied, all head-to-head criteria above are reapplied exclusively to this subset of teams;
Goal difference in all group matches;
Goals scored in all group matches;
(Qualifying group stage only) Away goals scored in all group matches;
(Qualifying group stage only) Wins in all group matches;
(Qualifying group stage only) Away wins in all group matches;
(Qualifying round only) Penalty shoot-out if only two teams have the same number of points, and they met in the last round of the group and are tied after applying all criteria above (not used if more than two teams have the same number of points, or if their rankings are not relevant for qualification for the next stage);
Disciplinary points (red card = 3 points, yellow card = 1 point, expulsion for two yellow cards in one match = 3 points);
UEFA coefficient ranking for the qualifying round or qualifying group stage draw;
(Qualifying round only) Drawing of lots.

To determine the five best third-placed teams from the qualifying round, the results against the teams in fourth place are discarded. To determine the six best runners-up from the qualifying group stage, all results are considered. The following criteria are applied (Regulations Articles 14.04 and 15.02):
Points;
Goal difference;
Goals scored;
(Qualifying group stage only) Away goals scored;
(Qualifying group stage only) Wins;
(Qualifying group stage only) Away wins;
Disciplinary points;
UEFA coefficient ranking for the qualifying round or qualifying group stage draw;
(Qualifying round only) Drawing of lots

In the qualifying round play-offs and play-offs, the team that scores more goals on aggregate over the two legs qualifies for the final tournament. If the aggregate score is level, the away goals rule is applied, i.e., the team that scores more goals away from home over the two legs advances. If away goals are also equal, extra time is played. The away goals rule is again applied after extra time, i.e., if there are goals scored during extra time and the aggregate score is still level, the visiting team advances by virtue of more away goals scored. If no goals are scored during extra time, the tie is decided by penalty shoot-out (Regulations Article 21.01).

Schedule
The qualifying matches are played on dates that fall within the FIFA Futsal International Match Calendar.

In the qualifying round, the schedule of each group is as follows, with one rest day between matchdays 2 and 3 for four-team groups, and no rest days for three-team groups (Regulations Articles 13.03, 23.02 and 23.03):

Note: For scheduling, the hosts are considered as Team 1, while the visiting teams are considered as Team 2, Team 3, and Team 4 according to their group positions.

In the qualifying group stage, the schedule of each group is as follows (Regulations Article 16.03):

Qualifying round

Draw
The draw for the qualifying round was held on 7 November 2019, 13:30 CET (UTC+1), at the UEFA headquarters in Nyon, Switzerland. The seeding was based on the new Elo-based futsal men's national-team coefficient ranking taken on 28 October 2019. The 33 teams were drawn into nine groups: six groups of four containing one team from each of the seeding positions 1–4, and three groups of three containing one team from each of the seeding positions 1–3. First, the nine teams which were pre-selected as hosts were drawn from their own designated pot and allocated to their respective group as per their seeding positions (since Malta were in seeding position 4, they had to be host a four-team group). Next, the remaining 24 teams were drawn from their respective pot which were allocated according to their seeding positions. Based on the decisions taken by the UEFA Emergency Panel, Kosovo and Bosnia and Herzegovina could not be drawn in the same group.

Notes
Teams marked in bold have qualified for the final tournament.
(H):  Teams pre-selected as hosts for the qualifying round

Groups
The winners of each group advanced to the qualifying group stage, while the runners-up of each group and the five best third-placed teams advanced to the qualifying round play-offs. The qualifying round was scheduled to be played between 29 January and 1 February 2020.

Times are CET (UTC+1), as listed by UEFA (local times, if different, are in parentheses).

Group A

Group B

Group C

Group D

Group E

Group F

Group G

Group H

Group I

Ranking of third-placed teams
To determine the five best third-placed teams from the qualifying round which advance to the qualifying round play-offs, only the results of the third-placed teams against the first and second-placed teams in their group are taken into account.

Qualifying round play-offs

Draw
The draw for the qualifying round play-offs was held on 13 February 2020, 14:15 CET (UTC+1), at the UEFA headquarters in Nyon, Switzerland. The seeding of the 14 teams (nine qualifying round group runners-up and best five qualifying round third-placed teams) was based on the new Elo-based futsal men's national-team coefficient ranking taken on 3 February 2020, with the seven group runners-up with the highest coefficient ranking seeded in Pot 2, and the remaining two group runners-up and the five third-placed teams unseeded in Pot 1. They were drawn into seven ties, with the teams in Pot 2 hosting the second leg. Teams from the same qualifying round group could not be drawn against each other.

Matches
The winners of each tie advance to the qualifying group stage to join the 16 teams which receive byes and the nine qualifying round group winners. The qualifying round play-offs were originally scheduled to be played between 6 and 15 April 2020, but had been postponed due to the COVID-19 pandemic, to a later date comprised tentatively between June and mid-December. On 17 June 2020, UEFA announced that the matches had been rescheduled to be played between 2 and 11 November 2020.

 
|}

Times are CET (UTC+1), as listed by UEFA (local times, if different, are in parentheses).

4–4 on aggregate. Greece won on away goals and qualified for Group 3 of the qualifying group stage.

Denmark won 4–1 on aggregate and qualified for Group 1 of the qualifying group stage.

Israel won 6–5 on aggregate and qualified for Group 5 of the qualifying group stage.

7–7 on aggregate. Switzerland won on away goals and qualified for Group 6 of the qualifying group stage.

North Macedonia won on walkover (awarded 10–0 on aggregate) and qualified for Group 4 of the qualifying group stage.

Armenia won 7–1 on aggregate and qualified for Group 2 of the qualifying group stage.

Montenegro won 5–1 on aggregate and qualified for Group 7 of the qualifying group stage.

Qualifying group stage

Draw
The draw for the qualifying group stage and play-offs was held on 2 September 2020, 13:15 CEST (UTC+2), at the UEFA headquarters in Nyon, Switzerland (originally scheduled on 14 May 2020, but postponed due to the COVID-19 pandemic, initially to 7 July 2020). The 32 teams were drawn into eight groups of four. The seeding of the 25 teams which had already qualified at the time of the draw (16 World Cup qualifying elite round teams which received bye to this round, and nine qualifying round group winners) was based on the new Elo-based futsal men's national-team coefficient ranking taken at the time of the draw, with eight teams seeded in each of Pots A, B and C, and one team seeded in Pot D. The seven qualifying round play-off winners, whose identity was not known at the time of the draw, were seeded in Pot E. First, the teams in Pot E were drawn into position 1 of Groups 1–7, and the team in Pot D were drawn into any of the positions 1, 2, 3 or 4 of Group 8. Next, the teams in Pots C, B and then A were drawn into any of the positions 1 (Group 8 only), 2, 3 or 4 of Groups 1–8. Based on the decisions taken by the UEFA Emergency Panel, Azerbaijan and Armenia (which may advance from the qualifying round play-offs), and Russia and Ukraine, could not be drawn in the same group.

Notes
(A1)–(I1): Qualifying round group winners

For the play-offs, the seventh and eighth best group runners-up, whose identity was not known at the time of the draw, were drawn to decide which team play the first leg at home.

Groups
The winners of each group and the six best runners-up qualify for the final tournament, while the remaining two runners-up advance to the play-offs. The qualifying group stage was originally scheduled to be played between February and September 2021. On 17 June 2020, UEFA announced that the matches had been rescheduled to be played between 2 November 2020 and 14 April 2021.

Times up to 27 March 2020 are CET (UTC+1), thereafter times are CEST (UTC+2), as listed by UEFA (local times, if different, are in parentheses).

Group 1

Group 2

Group 3

Group 4

Group 5

Group 6

Group 7

Group 8

Ranking of second-placed teams

Play-offs
The winner qualifies for the final tournament. The play-offs were originally scheduled to be played in October 2021. On 17 June 2020, UEFA announced that the matches had been rescheduled to be played between 14 and 17 November 2021.

|}

Times are CET (UTC+1), as listed by UEFA (local times, if different, are in parentheses).

Qualified teams
The following 16 teams qualify for the final tournament.

1 Bold indicates champions for that year. Italic indicates hosts for that year.

Notes

References

External links

Futsal Euro Matches: 2022 Qualifying, UEFA.com
Men's Futsal National Team Coefficients, UEFA.com

Qualifying
2022
Euro 2022 qualifying
Euro 2022 qualifying
Euro 2022 qualifying
January 2020 sports events in Europe
February 2020 sports events in Europe
November 2020 sports events in Europe
December 2020 sports events in Europe
January 2021 sports events in Europe
February 2021 sports events in Europe
March 2021 sports events in Europe
April 2021 sports events in Europe
November 2021 sports events in Europe
Sports events postponed due to the COVID-19 pandemic